Rožić is a surname. Notable people with the surname include:

Ante Rožić (born 1986), Australian-born Croatian footballer
Miroslav Rožić (born 1956), Croatian right-wing politician
Nily Rozic (born 1986), American politician
Vatroslav Rožić (1857–1937), Croatian linguist and ethnographer
Vedran Rožić (born 1954), former Croatian football player
Vesna Rožič (1987–2013), former Slovenian chess player

See also
Rožič Vrh, a settlement in the hills west of Črnomelj in the White Carniola area of Slovenia
 Rozić

Croatian surnames